Galagete consimilis is a moth in the family Autostichidae. It was described by Bernard Landry in 2002. It is found on the Galápagos Islands.

The wingspan is 8.5–9 mm for males and 8.5–10 mm for females. The forewings are dark brown to greyish brown with more or less distinct chestnut-coloured and darker brown markings. The hindwings are pale greyish white. Adults have been recorded on wing in February, March and August.

Etymology
The species name refers to the similarity between Galagete consimilis and Galagete darwini.

References

Moths described in 2002
Galagete